Honora Burke ( – 1698), married Patrick Sarsfield and went into French exile where he followed her soon afterwards. After his death at the Battle of Landen, she married James FitzJames, 1st Duke of Berwick, an illegitimate son of James II. She may have introduced the country dance (contredanse anglaise) to the French court.

Birth and origins 
Honora was born about 1675 at Portumna Castle, County Galway. She was the youngest child of William Burke and his second wife, Helen MacCarty. Her father was William Burke, 7th Earl of Clanricarde. The Burkes (originally De Burgh) were an Old English family long-established in Connacht. Her mother was a daughter of Donough MacCarty, 1st Earl of Clancarty and thus belonged to the MacCarthy of Muskerry dynasty, a Gaelic Irish family that descended from the kings of Desmond. She had previously been married to Sir John Fitzgerald of Dromana. Honora was raised as a Roman Catholic. She was often called Honora de Burgh during this period.

Early life 
Her father died in 1687 and was succeeded by her half-brother Richard as the 8th Earl of Clanricarde. Honora inherited a fortune of £3,500 from her father. Her mother married thirdly, sometime between 1687 and 1700, to Colonel Thomas Burke.

First marriage 
On 9 January 1689 Honora, aged 15, married Patrick Sarsfield, aged about 24, at Portumna Abbey. The couple went to live in Sarsfield's house at Lucan near Dublin. Sarsfield was at that time the eldest living son of a landowner from County Kildare and an experienced soldier, serving in the Irish Army of James II during the Williamite War in Ireland.

Sarsfield rose rapidly to become one of the leaders of the Jacobite movement in Ireland, noted in particular for the Ballyneety Raid on King William's artillery train shortly before the Siege of Limerick (1690). In January 1691 James II ennobled him for this achievement making him the 1st Earl of Lucan. She therefore became Countess of Lucan. After the surrender of Limerick following a second siege in 1691, Lucan led the defeated Irish Army to France to continue serving the exiled James II, an event known as the Flight of the Wild Geese.

Honora had probably left for France a year earlier with other Jacobite ladies. In France she was admired for her beauty and is said to have introduced "les contredanses anglaises" (English country dance) to the French Court. In 1692 her husband participated in a failed plan to invade England.

In April 1693 Honora and Patrick had one son:
James Francis Edward (1693–1719), became the 2nd Earl of Lucan and took part in the planned 1719 Jacobite Rising in Ireland, but died of natural causes shortly afterwards.

He was named after James Francis Edward Stuart, the Jacobite Prince of Wales, later known as the Old Pretender.

On 29 July 1693 Lucan was mortally wounded at the Battle of Landen and died shortly afterwards at Huy.

It has been said that Catalina Sarsfield, who married a German adventurer, known for having briefly established himself as King Theodore of Corsica, was a daughter of Honora and her first husband. In fact Catalina (the Spanish form of Catherine) came from the Limerick branch of the Sarsfield family and was born in Nantes to David Sarsfield, a distant cousin of Lucan. 

After Lucan's death the dowager countess joined the Jacobite court-in-exile at Saint-Germain-en-Laye near Paris. She tried to help the Irish community there, part of which lived in great poverty but lacked herself the means.

Second marriage 
At Saint-Germain-en-Laye the dowager Countess Lucan met James FitzJames, 1st Duke of Berwick and fell in love with him. Berwick was an illegitimate son of James II and Arabella Churchill, and pursued a brilliant military career since an early age. He had served alongside Lucan in Ireland. Honora married James on 26 March 1695 in the chapel of the Château de Saint-Germain-en-Laye. making her the Duchess of Berwick. The King was not overjoyed at the marriage, as he had wanted his son to make a grander match that might have helped the Jacobite cause. In that same year her husband was attainted in England and therefore lost, at least officially, his title. However, she and her husband continued to use it and were generally known as the Duke and Duchess of Berwick. Saint-Simon, for example calls him so in 1698.

Honora and James had a son:
James (1696–1738), who served in the Spanish Army and founded a dynasty in that country.

Death and timeline 
She died on 16 January 1698 of consumption, leaving her husband in "great grief". She was buried in the Convent of English Benedictines in Pontoise. Her burial was attended many prominent Jacobites: Henry FitzJames (Berwicks's brother), Lord Perth, Melfort, Richard Hamilton, James Porter, Lord Waldegrave, and Dominic Maguire (the Primate of all Ireland).

Her husband married Anne Bulkeley, daughter of Henry Bulkeley (Master of the Household to James II) three years later on 18 April 1700.

Notes and references

Notes

Citations

Sources 

 
  (for Clanricarde)
  – Jim Burke!
  – Canonteign to Cutts (for Clancarty and Clanricarde)
  – Scotland and Ireland
 
  – (for timeline)
 
 
 
  – Blood royal, dukes, earls (for Clanricarde)
 
 
 
  – Irish stem
 
 
  – 1698 
 
 
 
  (for timeline)

External links 
[http://indigo.ie/~wildgees/honora3.htm Wild Geese Heritage Museum and Library, Portumna

1675 births
1698 deaths
House of Burgh
17th-century Irish people
Daughters of Irish earls
Flight of the Wild Geese
Irish emigrants to France
Irish Jacobites
People from County Galway
Honora